Bethel, Pennsylvania may refer to:

Bethel Park, Pennsylvania
Bethel, Berks County, Pennsylvania
Bethel, Cambria County, Pennsylvania
Bethel, Mercer County, Pennsylvania
Bethel, Sullivan County, Pennsylvania
Bethel, Wayne County, Pennsylvania

See also
Bethel Township, Pennsylvania (disambiguation)
Mount Bethel, Pennsylvania